The Andy Warhol Art Authentication Board, Inc. was a private corporation that certified the authenticity of works by the artist, Andy Warhol, from 1995 to early 2012.

History
The organization was created in 1995 in association with The Andy Warhol Foundation for the Visual Arts.

The Board, based in New York City, consisted of six members, including art historians, curators and those who personally knew Warhol and his work. They met three times a year to examine works and made determinations only of authenticity, not market value. Appraisals took one month and ARTnews reported that around 10 to 20% of submitted works were 'considered questionable.' The Board did not share its methodology, citing privacy concerns. Board members included American art curator David Whitney and designer Jed Johnson.

The Board sometimes received criticism for its operating methods and what was perceived as arbitrariness in judging whether or not a work was an authentic Warhol. Works deemed inauthentic that were covered prominently in the press include 'Brillo Boxes' produced after Warhol's death and a 1964 silkscreen self-portrait that had earlier been authenticated by Warhol's business manager.

Dissolution
In October 2011, the Andy Warhol Foundation Board of Directors dissolved the Authentication Board. Speaking to The New York Observer, Warhol Foundation President Joel Wachs explained the reasons for the decision, saying the Authentication Board was subjected to legal action '10 or so times' in its 15 years of operation. While it 'won every single one of those lawsuits, [...] the process was extraordinarily expensive, costing us at least $10 million defending ourselves. Eventually, we decided that we wanted our money to go to artists and not to lawyers'.

The Foundation continues to support development of the Warhol catalogues raisonnés, which encompass judgements about the authenticity of individual works. Wachs explains that the catalogue project is primarily scholarly and not explicitly connected to the art market. The editors review works submitted for possible inclusion, but do not render judgement outside the context of the catalogues themselves.

References

External links
 My Andy Warhol, Joe Simon site

Andy Warhol